AEA Investors is an American middle market private equity firm.  The firm focuses on leveraged buyout, growth capital, and mezzanine capital investments in manufacturing, service, distribution, specialty chemicals, consumer product, and business services companies in the middle market.  The firm makes investments primarily in the US and Europe, and periodically invests in Asia as well.

AEA was founded in 1968 to make investments on behalf of S.G. Warburg & Co. as well as the Rockefeller, Mellon, and Harriman families. AEA was formally founded as American European Associates.

AEA is headquartered in New York City with offices in Stamford, Connecticut, London, Munich, and Shanghai. From 1998 until 2011, the firm was chaired by Vincent Mai. John Garcia is the current CEO and Chairman.

Fund raising
Since 1983, the firm has raised more than $15 billion of capital from high-net-worth individuals and institutional investors across its private equity and debt funds.

Middle Market Private Equity:
 $500 million - AEA Fund I
 $1.0 billion - AEA Fund II
 2003 - $1.2 billion - AEA Fund III Investment Program
 2006 - $1.5 billion - AEA Fund IV Investment Program
 2012 - $2.4 billion - AEA Fund V Investment Program
 2016 - $3.2 billion - AEA Fund VI Investment Program
 2019 - $4.8 billion - AEA Fund VII Investment Program

Small Business Private Equity: 
 2004 - $286 million - AEA Small Business Fund I
 2009 - $350 million - AEA Small Business Fund II
 2016 - $443 million - AEA Small Business Fund III
 2019 - $877 million - AEA Small Business Fund IV

Mezzanine Debt:
 2005 - $600 million (includes leverage) - AEA Mezzanine Fund I
 2008 - $420 million - AEA Mezzanine Fund II
 2013 - $575 million - AEA Mezzanine Fund III

Middle Market Debt:
 2007 - $320 million (includes leverage) - AEA Middle Market Debt Fund I
 2011 - $410 million (includes leverage) - AEA Middle Market Debt Fund II
 2012 - $220 million (includes leverage) - AEA Middle Market Debt Fund IIP

Investments
 Evoqua Water Technologies LLC 
Acosta Inc.
 Hospitalists Management Group, LLC
 NCGA holdings
 Behavioral Interventions Inc.
 Suncoast Roofing Supply
 Houghton International
 Unifrax Corporation
 Pregis
 CPG International
 Henry Corporation
 Convenience Food Systems
 Singer Equities
 Burt's Bees (sold to Clorox in 2007)
 Brand Networks
 Pro Mach Group, Inc.
 Dayton Parts, LLC.
 24 Hour Fitness
 Jack's
 Veseris
 Scan Global Logistics

See also
List of private equity firms

Notes

External links
AEA Investors (company website)

1968 establishments in New York (state)
Financial services companies established in 1968
Private equity firms of the United States
Hedge fund firms in New York City